The following is a list of districts of La Libertad Region by population of census 2007 and estimated population for year 2014 according to INEI.

See also 
List of metropolitan areas of Peru
Demographics of Peru
La Libertad Region

References 

La Libertad Region